Malesh Soro is a South Sudanese professional football manager.

Career
Since July 2011 until June 2012 he coached the South Sudan national football team. Malesh Soro was the first South Sudan national football team manager

References

External links
Profile at Soccerway.com

Year of birth missing (living people)
Living people
South Sudanese football managers
South Sudan national football team managers
Place of birth missing (living people)